Henry Sidney (1529–1586) was the Lord Deputy of Ireland.

Henry Sidney or Sydney may also refer to:

Henry Sydney, 1st Earl of Romney (1641–1704), English politician and army officer
Henry Sydney, 1st Viscount Sydney of Sheppey from Daniel Finch, 2nd Earl of Nottingham

See also
Harry Sydney (born 1959), American football player
Harry Sydney (music hall) (1825-1870), English music hall entertainer